Jasper is an unincorporated community in Lee County, Virginia, United States.

History
A post office was established at Jasper in 1897, and remained in operation until it was discontinued in 1918. The community was likely named for Jasper Edens, a railman.

References

Unincorporated communities in Lee County, Virginia
Unincorporated communities in Virginia